Marouf Suleiman al-Bakhit (born 1947) is a Jordanian politician who was twice Prime Minister. He first served as Prime Minister from 27 November 2005 until 25 November 2007 and then again from 9 February 2011 to 17 October 2011. Bakhit also held the position of Jordanian ambassador to Israel and the national security chief. Appointed as Prime Minister by King Abdullah II less than three weeks after the 2005 Amman bombings, Bakhit's main priorities were to maintain security and stability in Jordan. He was reappointed as Prime Minister by the King on 1 February 2011, following weeks of protests.

He resigned from his post on 17 October 2011, and was succeeded by Awn Shawkat Al-Khasawneh on 24 October.

Education
Bakhit graduated with a bachelor's degree in General Management and Political Science from University of Jordan. He also earned a Masters in Public Administration from the University of Southern California in 1982, and a PhD in Strategic Studies from King's College London in 1990. His PhD thesis is entitled "The evolution of Egyptian air defence strategy 1967-1973".

Military career
Marouf al-Bakhit comes from Jordan's Al-Abbadi Tribe. He joined the Jordanian Armed Forces in 1964, and graduated from the Royal Military College in 1966 as Second Lieutenant. He retired from the Armed Forces in 1999 as Major General.

Prime Minister
Bakhit has been Prime Minister twice, first from 27 November 2005 until 25 November 2007, and then from 1 February 2011.

First term
Bakhit was appointed by King Abdullah II less than three weeks after the 2005 Amman bombings. The 2005 Amman bombings were a series of coordinated bomb attacks on three hotels in Amman, Jordan, on 9 November 2005. The attacks killed 60 people and injured 115 others.

After two years of trying to get reforms through the parliament, followed by a questionable election, he resigned and was replaced by Nader al-Dahabi.

Second term
After two weeks of street protests, on 1 February 2011 King Abdullah fired his prime minister, Samir Rifai, and re-appointed Bakhit to his old position. While continuing to maintain a moderate stance in respect to the United States and the 1994 Jordan-Israel peace treaty, al-Bakhit has promised to effect changes in election laws, decentralize authority and grant further rights to political parties.

King Abdullah II accepted his resignation on 17 October 2011 and appointed Awn Shawkat Al-Khasawneh as Prime Minister.

Career highlights
Member of the Jordanian Delegation for Israel-Jordan peace treaty
Lecturer of political science at Mutah University (1997–1999)

See also 
 List of prime ministers of Jordan

References

External links

|-

1947 births
Alumni of King's College London
Ambassadors of Jordan to Israel
Ambassadors of Jordan to Turkey
Jordanian expatriates in the United Kingdom
Living people
People of the Arab Spring
Prime Ministers of Jordan
University of Jordan alumni
Defence ministers of Jordan
Jordanian generals
USC Sol Price School of Public Policy alumni
Members of the Senate of Jordan
Academic staff of Mutah University